In enzymology, an aminomuconate-semialdehyde dehydrogenase is an enzyme that catalyzes the chemical reaction

2-aminomuconate 6-semialdehyde + NAD+ + H2O  2-aminomuconate + NADH + 2 H+

The 3 substrates of this enzyme are 2-aminomuconate 6-semialdehyde, NAD+, and H2O, whereas its 3 products are 2-aminomuconate, NADH, and H+.

This enzyme belongs to the family of oxidoreductases, specifically those acting on the aldehyde or oxo group of donor with NAD+ or NADP+ as acceptor. This enzyme participates in 3 metabolic pathways: benzoic acid degradation via hydroxylation, tryptophan metabolism, and the degradation pathway for toluene and xylene.

Nomenclature 

The systematic name of this enzyme class is 2-aminomuconate-6-semialdehyde:NAD+ 6-oxidoreductase. Other names in common use include 2-aminomuconate semialdehyde dehydrogenase, 2-hydroxymuconic acid semialdehyde dehydrogenase, 2-hydroxymuconate semialdehyde dehydrogenase, alpha-aminomuconic epsilon-semialdehyde dehydrogenase, alpha-hydroxymuconic epsilon-semialdehyde dehydrogenase, and 2-hydroxymuconic semialdehyde dehydrogenase.

References

Further reading 

 

EC 1.2.1
NADH-dependent enzymes
Enzymes of unknown structure